is the largest and the most populous island among the Miyako Islands of Okinawa Prefecture, Japan. Miyako Island is administered as part of the City of Miyakojima, which includes not only Miyako Island, but also five other populated islands.

Geography
The island is triangular in shape and is composed of limestone. Miyako-jima is subject to drought and is frequently struck by typhoons.

It is considered by many as one of the most beautiful spots in Japan. Other notable locations include Yonaha Maehama beach, Sunayama beach, Painagama Beach and the sights on Irabu-jima.

Ikema Bridge connects Miyako Island and Ikema Island. It is -long and was completed in February 1992. Yonaha Maehama beach can be viewed from the opposite side on Kurima Island. The Miyako language, one of several Ryukyuan languages spoken there to some degree.

Gallery

Climate

Culture
In Miyako Island, Miruku-potoke (the local name for the Maitreya Buddha) is traditionally believed to be an ugly god who arrives from China to create humans, animals, and crops. The handsome god Saku-potoke (the historical Shakyamuni Buddha, founder of Buddhism) then challenges him to a flower contest and steals the flower while the other sleeps. Miruku-potoke is thus defeated and forced to return to China, which is why China is a prosperous country while Miyako is not. Nearly identical creation myths are found in Korea.

Miyako is home to a unique festival called Paantu (パーントゥ), which occurs in the ninth month of the cultural (lunar) calendar.  Three men dressed in grass, leaves and mud walk around town smearing the mud on houses, cars and people. They carry sticks in one hand and an expressionless mask in the other. Legend holds that those who have been muddied by the Pantu will have a year of protection and good fortune. Owners of new homes will also invite Pantu to give a muddy 'blessing' to their homes.

Miyako has its own version of soba.  Otōri is a custom of drinking awamori, a distilled beverage native to Okinawa, Japan. It is performed by people sitting (usually around a table).  One offers a toast, drinks from a small glass, and then offers some to each person at the table making a round, and usually going to the right. When the toaster makes their way back to their spot, the person who passed the otori before pours them another glass. They then announce "tsunagimasu" and drink their second glass.  After a brief interval, it is then the turn of the next person to pass the otori, which continues until the celebration is ended.

Economy
Miyako is home to sugarcane cultivation, and produces brown sugar. Miyako jōfu is a locally produced hand-woven textile made from ramie fiber. It was formerly known as Satsuma jōfu. The textile traces its production to the Tensho period, 1573–92.

A large tourism boom in Miyako, starting with locals and Taiwanese visitors in the early 2010s, has been steadily growing with the annual number of tourists reaching over 1 million in both 2018 and 2019.  The city has been struggling to cope with cruise megaships from mainland China– currently, the central port in Hirara can only handle ships as large as 50,000 tons but port officials hope to service ships as large as 200,000 tons. The effects of this growing tourist industry may change the character of the island as its population is small and rural.

Defense
The Miyako Strait has strategic significance. Chinese warships' passage through the straits is monitored by Japanese forces.

In late April 2015, it was confirmed that the Japanese Ministry of Defense was in advanced planning regarding the permanent deployment of a GSDF security unit to Miyakojima, to begin sometime in fiscal year 2016. This is part of ongoing efforts to improve the defenses of the Nansei Islands. A GSDF security unit is a battalion sized force, of up to 500 personnel, whose role on Miyakojima will include providing the initial response to large-scale disasters in the area as well as acting as a rapid response force to counterattacks on remote islands within its area of responsibility.

The Miyakojima security unit's exact composition is unclear as of April 2015, though given its known taskings, it is likely that the TOE will include both the Komatsu LAV and soft skinned vehicles with all terrain capability.

Consideration is also currently being given to deploying GSDF units equipped with anti-aircraft and anti-ship missiles to the island.

Tokyo has currently earmarked ¥21.2 billion yen ($205 million USD) in FY2021 to build new Japan Coast Guard patrol boats and helicopters for the region, with plans to assign 22 ships of over 1,000 tons in the region by 2024. Miyako-jima's Coast Guard station is home to 9 Shimoji-class small patrol vessels and a Tokara-class medium patrol vessel.

Positioned in between the larger commercial ports of Ishigaki and Naha, Coast Guard facilities on Miyako's neighbor islands can provide 3 Tsugarus, a Kunigami, and a Hateruma class patrol vessel based at the 11th Regional Coast Guard Headquarters in Naha and 11 Kunigami-class patrol vessels and 2 Hateruma-class patrol vessels homeported at Ishigaki should the need arise. Along with facilities for housing up to 600 crew, Ishigaki is now JCG's largest base, surpassing even that of Yokohama.

Points of interest
 Miyakojima City Tropical Plant Garden
 Japan Airlines maintains a ticketing office on Miyako Island. It is only for domestic flights.
 Miyakojima  Ultramarathon.
 Higashi-hennazaki Eastern Cape of Miyako Island

Transportation

Airlines
Miyako Airport

Lanes
Port of Hirara
Port of Shimairi - For Ōgami-jima

Buses
Miyako Kyoei Bus
Yachiyo Bus
Kyowa Bus
Chuo Kotsu - For Shimojijima Airport in Shimoji-jima

Trains
The only railway on this island is operated in Shigira Resort, and conformed as a Chairlift, which connects the westernmost with the southernmost points of railway in Japan.
Stations : Shigira-ue - the westernmost railway station in Japan. Shigira-shita - the southernmost railway station in Japan.

See also

 Paantu
 Miyako Airport
 MIM-104F (PAC-3)
 Type 3 Chū-SAM

References

External links

Miyakojima Website (Japanese)
Pantu in Japanese
WLCM.net, Miyako Folklore English translation by Mark Wisniewski
WLMC.net, Miyako Natural Science English translation by Mark Wisniewski

Miyako Islands
Islands of Okinawa Prefecture
Japan Ground Self-Defense Force